HMS Dumbarton Castle was the Royal Scottish Naval vessel of the same name transferred to the Royal Navy by the Act of Union of 1707. Her design was based on the standardize 20-gun sixth rates building in England at the time. After commissioning she was assigned to Home Waters. She was captured by the French in April 1708 off Waterford.

Dumbarton Castle was the first named vessel in the Royal Navy.

Construction
She was built for the Scottish Navy on the Thames in 1696 then transferred by the Act of Union to the Royal Navy in 1707. No information is available on her parameters, however, her specifications were probably based on the Maidstone group that was being built at this time. She carried the standard armament of a sixth rate of twenty 6-pounders on the upper deck (UD) and four 4-pounders on the quarterdeck (QD).

Commissioned service
She was commissioned on 28 November 1707 under the command of Commander Mathew Campbell, RN.

Disposition
She was captured by the French 44-gun Le Jersey off Waterford on 26 April 1708.

Citations

References
 Winfield 2009, British Warships in the Age of Sail (1603 – 1714), by Rif Winfield, published by Seaforth Publishing, England © 2009, EPUB , Chapter 6, The Sixth Rates, Vessels acquired from 2 May 1660, Ex-Scottish Acquisitions, Dumbarton Castle
 Winfield 2007, British Warships in the Age of Sail (1714 – 1792), by Rif Winfield, published by Seaforth Publishing, England © 2007, EPUB , Chapter 6, Sixth Rates, Sixth Rates of 20 or 24 guns, Vessels in service at 1 August 1714, Ex-Scottish Acquisitions, Dumbarton Castle
 Colledge, Ships of the Royal Navy, by J.J. Colledge, revised and updated by Lt Cdr Ben Warlow and Steve Bush, published by Seaforth Publishing, Barnsley, Great Britain, © 2020, e  (EPUB), Section D (Dumbarton Castle)

 

1690s ships
Corvettes of the Royal Navy
Naval ships of the United Kingdom